The Maltese Player of the Year Award is an annual award given to the player who is adjudged to have been the best of the year in Maltese football. The award has been presented since the 1954–55 season and the winner is chosen by a vote amongst the members of the players' trade union, the Professional Footballers' Association (MFA).

The first winner of the award was Floriana player Lolly Debattista, and the current holder is Jurgen Degabriele of Hibernians.

Winners

Breakdown of winners

Winners by club

References 

Footballers in Malta
Awards established in 1954
1954 establishments in Malta
Maltese awards
Annual events in Malta
Association football player non-biographical articles